Aaj Ka Samson is a 1991 Indian Hindi-language romance drama film directed by Kukoo Kapoor, starring Hemant Birje, Sahila Chadha, Goga Kapoor and Puneet Issar. It is modern reworking of the Biblical tale of Samson and Delilah.

Plot
This is the story of two friends who want to spend their lives together since childhood. But in future they become apart.

Cast
 Hemant Birje as Samson
 Goga Kapoor as Manga
 Sahila Chadha as Juliet
 Kiran Kumar as Karan Singh
 Puneet Issar as Sanga
 Neeta Kapoor
 Vishal Dutt

Soundtrack
Lyrics: Abhilash

References

External links

1991 films
1990s Hindi-language films
Films scored by Prem Gupta
Films about Samson
Indian romantic drama films
Christian mass media in India
Films based on the Hebrew Bible